Aethes ferruginea is a species of moth of the family Tortricidae. It was described by Walsingham in 1900. It is endemic to Syria.

References

ferruginea
Endemic fauna of Syria
Moths described in 1900
Moths of Asia